The Aliwagwag Protected Landscape is a protected area that preserves a major drainage catchment in the southern Philippine island of Mindanao in the Davao Region. It contains the headwaters of the Cateel River in the southern Diuata Mountain Range which provides the water source and irrigation for surrounding rice fields and communities in Davao de Oro and Davao Oriental provinces. It was named after the remote rural village in the municipality of Cateel where Aliwagwag Falls, the country's highest waterfall, is located.

The protected landscape is part of the Philippines' National Integrated Protected Areas System and was established in 2011 through Proclamation No. 139 issued by President Benigno Aquino III. It was initially a component of the  Agusan–Davao–Surigao Forest Reserve declared in 1931 through Proclamation No. 369 by Governor-General Dwight F. Davis which underwent several amendments over the years to open up a few areas in the mineral rich watershed to mining.

Description

Aliwagwag is situated in the Eastern Mindanao Biodiversity Corridor which contains one of the largest remaining blocks of tropical lowland rainforest in the Philippines.

The protected landscape is composed of lowland forests, with some areas of montane and mossy forests around the peaks of the mountains. A small Mandaya community who practice slash-and-burn agriculture and plantation farming can also be found in the park's lower slopes.

Aliwagwag is accessible via the new Compostela–Cateel Road that runs through the park and near the waterfall connecting northern Davao Oriental with Compostela.

Biodiversity
Aliwagwag occupies an important bird and biodiversity area in the Upper Cateel River Basin of the Agtuuganon–Pasian mountains. Its forest is home to the Philippine eagle as well as several other threatened and endemic bird species such as the Visayan miniature babbler, little slaty flycatcher and Lina's sunbird. The park also hosts the Philippine hawk-eagle, Philippine dwarf kingfisher, spotted imperial pigeon, giant scops owl, and Hombron's kingfisher. It is also home to the tallest trees in the Philippines, the Philippine rosewood, known locally as toog. In the waters of the upper Cateel River, a rare species of fish can be found called sawugnun by locals which is harvested as a delicacy.

References

Protected landscapes of the Philippines
Geography of Davao Oriental
Tourist attractions in Davao Oriental
Geography of Davao de Oro
Protected areas established in 2011
2011 establishments in the Philippines